Mikael Gustaf Örn (born 29 November 1961) is a Swedish freestyle and medley swimmer whose notability, during the 1980s, stems from winning a bronze medal at the 1984 Summer Olympics, held in Los Angeles.

A native of the southwestern coastal city of Gothenburg, the nation's second-largest and the capital of Västra Götaland County, Mikael Örn, who is 195 cm tall [6 ft. 5 in.], competed in the medal-winning  freestyle relay along with teammates Thomas Lejdström, Bengt Baron and Per Johansson. His best individual result at the 1984 Olympics was 16th place in men's 200 m individual medley.

Clubs
 Kristianstads SLS

References

External links
 

Olympic swimmers of Sweden
Swimmers at the 1984 Summer Olympics
Olympic bronze medalists for Sweden
Swimmers from Gothenburg
1961 births
Living people
Olympic bronze medalists in swimming
Swedish male freestyle swimmers
Swedish male medley swimmers
Medalists at the 1984 Summer Olympics